Laurie O'Brien (born February 16, 1951) is an American actress who started her career in Los Angeles in 1982 with her role in Timerider: The Adventure of Lyle Swann. She is best known for voicing Baby Piggy on the 1980s Saturday morning cartoon Jim Henson's Muppet Babies from 1984-1991 & the CTW animated series Cro as Ivana the mammoth. As an on-camera actress, O'Brien has guest starred on the soap opera Santa Barbara as a hooker as well as other numerous TV series including Trapper John, M.D., NYPD Blue, Matlock, Chicago Hope, ER, CSI, CSI Miami, 7th Heaven, Reasonable Doubts, Shark, Three Rivers, Detroit 1-8-7, and L.A. Law on which she played a woman on trial for killing her rapist. TV movies include The Defiant Ones, Too Young to Die?, Infidelity, Children of the Night, Convicted, and One More Mountain. Movies include Bottle Shock in which she played Christopher Pine's mother. Laurie has an extensive background in theater winning three major awards for her lead roles in Mary Barnes, Savage in Limbo and Times Like These.

Personal life
She is married to Carl Weintraub, with a son, Cory O'Brien.

Filmography
 St. Elsewhere - Mrs. Morgen
 The Adventures of the American Rabbit - Bunny O'Hare
 Dungeons & Dragons - Additional Voices
 Jim Henson's Muppet Babies - Baby Piggy and Captain Black Wig
 Cartoon All-Stars to the Rescue - Baby Piggy and the Mom
 The Defiant Ones (1986) - Pauline

Awards
L.A. Drama Critics Circle award for Mary Barnes, 1981
L.A. Drama Critics Circle Award for Savage in Limbo, 1987
Ovation Award, Times Like These, 2003

External links

1951 births
Living people
20th-century American actresses
21st-century American actresses
American television actresses
American voice actresses